Box, Inc. (formerly Box.net) is a public company based in Redwood City, California. It develops and markets cloud-based content management, collaboration, and file sharing tools for businesses. Box was founded in 2005 by Aaron Levie and Dylan Smith. Initially, it focused on consumers, but around 2009 and 2010 Box pivoted to focus on business users. The company raised about $500 million over numerous funding rounds, before going public in 2015. Its software allows users to store and manage files in an online folder system accessible from any device. Users can then comment on the files, share them, apply workflows, and implement security and governance policies.

History
The idea for Box.com started in 2003 with Aaron Levie, who was a business student at University of Southern California. He wrote a paper for school on the industry for storing digital files online and started developing the Box service in 2004. In 2005, Levie dropped out of school to work on Box full-time with long-time friend and cofounder Dylan Smith. Initially, the software was developed in the attic of Smith's parents' house, then in a garage owned by Levie's uncle that had been converted into a living space. Levie and Smith were joined by cofounders Jeff Queisser and Sam Ghods. The founders relied on their own money as well as support from friends and family members, until Mark Cuban invested $350,000 in seed funding in 2005. 

The Box service was released in 2005. In the first year after its release, the company's revenue was in the tens of thousands of dollars. It raised $1.5 million in series A funding in 2006 and $6 million in Series B funding in 2008. Box's revenues grew 500% from 2008 to 2009. By 2010, the company had raised $29.5 million in funding and the service had four million users.

Box was initially focused on consumers, but many of those consumers used the service at work. Box pivoted to focus on business users around 2009 and 2010. The company developed features to embed Box in common business applications or use APIs to integrate with them. In 2009, it acquired Increo Solutions, which developed software for previewing and collaborating on digital files. In 2011, a reworked version of the Box service was released with technical improvements designed for handling large numbers of business users, changes to the user interface, and more collaboration features. The company started developing its first industry-specific features for heavily regulated industries in 2012, when it introduced tools for HIPAA compliance at healthcare organizations.  

Box also expanded internationally, with offices in London, Berlin, and Tokyo, among other locations. In 2011, the company raised $48 million in funding to support its data centers. This was followed by an additional $125 million in funding round the next year, $100 million in 2013, and $150 million in 2014. By 2014, Box had made five acquisitions. These included the 2013 acquisition of Crocodoc, which developed software for opening documents online, and dLoop, which focused on analytics related to digital files. The company also purchased Streem for its technology that synchronizes files between devices and online files.

On January 23, 2015 Box became a public company via an initial public offering on the New York Stock Exchange. In November 2014, Box acquired MedXT, which developed medical software, for $3.84 million. The following February, it acquired cloud management service Airpost. Box moved its headquarters to its current location in Redwood City, California in January 2016. In July 2018, Box acquired search engine company Butter.ai. In 2019, hedge fund Starboard Value took a 7.5% stake in the company.

In May 2020, Box announced a new version with improved integration with videotelephony software, as well as a feature called Collections that allows users to customize their personal folder structure, due to the increase in remote work during the COVID-19 pandemic.

Box acquired e-signature startup SignRequest for $55 million, in February 2021. In April 2021, Box announced that it had accepted a $500 million investment from KKR, a private equity firm.

Features

Box.com is a cloud-based content management system with collaboration, security, analytics and other features related to files and information. There is a core Box service, then add-ons for different industries and situations. Box is used to manage, share, and collaborate on digital files. As of 2017, there are about 41 million users, constituting 6.5% of the market for software that helps manage, share, and collaborate on digital files.

Box stores files in an online folder system that can be accessed from any device with an internet connection. Often, a copy of the files are also stored on the user's devices, then synchronized with the online version. Users can invite "collaborators" that can upload or modify files or the user can share specific files or folders. Users can also create certain files directly in Box.com and add comments or notes that are visible from the folder system. 

Box began as a simple service for storing, sharing, and syncing files among different users and devices, but developed over time into an enterprise product with features for security and compliance. Files on Box are encrypted using TLS encryption. Each user has access to their own documents, as well as to corporate files that the IT department manages. IT staff can also set other access and security policies, get audit information like who accessed what files, and receive alerts for suspicious downloads. Box's open APIs allow it to integrate with common business applications. For example, one integration allows users to save files to their Box.com folders directly from Microsoft applications. The company also provides consulting, support, and other services.  

Box held its first annual conference, BoxWorks, in January 2010, initially under the name Altitude. The first conference drew about 300 attendees, but grew to about 3,000 by 2013.

See also
 Comparison of file hosting services
 Comparison of file synchronization software
 Comparison of online backup services

References

External links
 
 Q&A Interview with Box CEO on CNET

2005 establishments in Washington (state)
American companies established in 2005
Computer-related introductions in 2005
2015 initial public offerings
File sharing services
File hosting for macOS
File hosting for Windows
File sharing
Companies listed on the New York Stock Exchange
Companies based in Redwood City, California
One-click hosting